Haiti–Mexico relations are the diplomatic relations between Haiti and Mexico. Both nations are members of Association of Caribbean States, Community of Latin American and Caribbean States, Organization of American States and the United Nations.

History 
Haiti was the first Latin-American nation to gain independence in 1804 from France. This result inspired several nations in the region in their struggle for independence. In 1816, Mexican General Martín Javier Mina y Larrea traveled to Haiti to gain support for Mexico's independence from Spain. Consular relations between Haiti and Mexico were established in 1882 with formal diplomatic relations being established in 1929. In 1934, a Mexican diplomatic office was opened in Port-au-Prince and in 1943 the diplomatic office was elevated to an embassy. That same year, Haiti opened an embassy in Mexico City.

Between the years 1957–1986, Haiti was ruled by President François Duvalier and later by his son, Jean-Claude Duvalier. During this time period, several high level Haitian politicians, students and activists sought refuge in the Mexican embassy in the capital including former politician and author, Gérard Pierre-Charles who spent 26 years living in Mexico. In February 1991, President Jean-Bertrand Aristide came to power. He was later toppled in a coup d'état in September 1991 and forced to flee the country. That same month, Aristide's Prime Minister René Préval sought refuge in the Mexican embassy where he remained for eleven months until being granted safe-conduct and fled to Mexico. René Préval would later become President of Haiti in February 1996 – 2001 and again in 2006 – 2011.

In January 2010, Haiti experienced a 7.0 earthquake. Like several countries, Mexico responded by providing food and other essential emergency aid. Soon following the earthquake, over 1,300 Mexican medical workers arrived to Haiti along with 15,000 tons of humanitarian aid and over 51 thousand tents to provide temporary shelter. Mexican soldiers also partook in search and rescue. Since 2010, the Mexican government has given over US$8 million in financial assistance to the Haitian government and people.

In 2012, President Felipe Calderón became the first Mexican head-of-state to visit Haiti. While in Haiti, President Calderon met with Haitian President Michel Martelly and they discussed bilateral relations between both nations and Mexico's development aid to the country. In 2016, approximately 5,000 Haitian nationals, while in Mexico; were denied entry into the United States when President Barack Obama ended allowing Haitians into the country on humanitarian grounds. Many of the Haitians remained in Mexico, primarily in the border cities of Mexicali and Tijuana.

As part of an effort to increase humanitarian assistance and help with the recuperation of Haiti, Mexico provides government scholarships to 300 Haitian students to study at Mexican universities per year. These students also receive a US$625 monthly stipend while their studies continue. The first 103 students arrived in 2013, followed by 93 in 2014 and the rest arriving in 2015.

In November 2021 Haiti opened a consulate in the southern Mexican city of Tapachula, Chiapas to best attend to the surge of Haitian migrants entering Mexico.

High-level visits

Presidential visits from Haiti to Mexico

 President Jean-Bertrand Aristide (2004)
 President René Préval (2010) 
 President Michel Martelly (2014, 2015)
 President Jovenel Moïse  (2017)

Presidential visits from Mexico to Haiti

 President Felipe Calderón (2012)
 President Enrique Peña Nieto (2013)

Bilateral agreements 
Both nations have signed a few bilateral agreement such as an Agreement for mutual non-fee visa issuance (1942) and an Agreement on Technical and Scientific Cooperation.

Trade relations 

In 2018, total trade between the two nations amounted to US$100 million. Haiti's main exports to Mexico include: textiles and clothing. Mexico's main exports to Haiti include: wheat, textiles and electric accumulators. Mexican multinational company Cemex operates in Haiti.

Resident diplomatic missions 
 Haiti has an embassy in Mexico City and a consulate in Tapachula.
 Mexico has an embassy in Port-au-Prince.

See also
 Haitian Mexicans

References 

 
Mexico
Bilateral relations of Mexico